The Shah Mir dynasty was a dynasty that ruled the region of Kashmir in the Indian subcontinent. The dynasty is named after its founder, Shah Mir.

Origins
The dynasty was established by Shah Mir in 1339 CE, there are two theories regarding Shah Mir's origin. Historian A. Q. Rafiqi states that some Persian chronicles of Kashmir describe Shah Mir as a descendant of the rulers of Swat. He thinks it more likely that he was a descendant of Turkish or Persian immigrants to Swat, who had intermarried with local indigenous peoples. It has also been suggested that he belonged to a family which accompanied the sage Mir Sayyid Ali Hamadani, and who were associated to either the Kubrawiya، Sufi groups in Kashmir. According to Jonaraja, Shah Mir was the descendant of Partha 
(Arjuna) of Mahabharata fame. Abu ’l-Fadl Allami, Nizam al-Din and Firishta also state
that Shah Mir traced his descent to Arjuna, the basis of their account being Jonaraja’s 
Rajatarangini, which Mulla Abd al-Qadir Bada’uni translated into Persian at Akbar’s
orders. This seems to be official genealogy of the Sultanate.

On the other hand, the 15th century Kashmiri historian Jonaraja, writing in the court of Shah Mir's descendant Budshah, states that Shah Mir came to Kashmir along with his tribe from the country of Panchagahvara (identified as the Panjgabbar valley between Rajouri and Budhal). He was said to belong to the family of an ancestor called Partha, who was described as a second Partha (an allusion to the Mahabharata hero Arjuna). Some scholars state that the Panjgabbar valley was peopled by Khasas and so ascribe a Khasa ethnicity to Shah Mir.

According to Wink, Shah Mir may have been an Afghan or a Qaruna Turk, or even a Tibetan. Kashmiri scholar N. K. Zutshi, having critically examined the sources, reconciles the two versions by noting that the Persian chronicles mentions Swadgir rather than Swat, which he interprets as Swadgabar, meaning "suburbs of Gabar", which coincides with Jonaraja's description of Panchagahvara-Simani (on the borders of Panchagagvara).

A. Q. Rafiqi states:

History

Shah Mir

Shah Mir worked to establish Islam in Kashmir and was aided by his descendant rulers, specially Sikandar Butshikan. He reigned for three years and five months from 1339 to 1342 CE. He was the ruler of Kashmir and the founder of the Shah Mir dynasty. He was followed by his two sons who became kings in succession.

Jamshid

Sultan Shamsu'd-Din Shah was succeeded by his elder son Sultan Jamshid who ruled for a year and two months. In 1343 CE, Sultan Jamshid suffered a defeat by his brother who ascended the throne as Sultan Alau'd-Din in 1347 CE.

Alau'd-Din
Sultan Alau'd-Din's two sons became kings in succession, Sultan Shihabu'd-Din and Sultan Qutbu'd-Din.

Shibu'd-Din 
He was the only Shah Mir ruler to keep Hindu courtiers in his court. Prominent among them were Kota Bhat and Udyashri. Ruler of Kashgar (Central Asia) once attacked Kashmir with a large army. Sultan Shihabu’d-din did not have a large number of soldiers to battle against the Kashgar army. But with a small army, he fought and defeated the whole army of Kashgar. After this battle, the regions of Ladakh and Baltistan which were under the rule of Kashgar came under the rule of Shah Miris.Sultan also marched towards Delhi and the army of Feroz Shah Tughlaq opposed him at the banks of River Satluj. Since the battle was motive-less for the Delhi Sultanate peace concluded between them on a condition that all the territories from Sirhind to Kashmir belong to the Shah Mir empire.

Shihabu’d-din was also a great administrator who governed his kingdom with firmness and justice. A town named Shihabu’d-dinpura aka Shadipur was founded by him. He was also called the Lalitaditya of Medieval Kashmir as he erected many mosques and monasteries.

Qutubu'd-Din 
He was the next Sultan of Kashmir. The only significance of his rule is that the Sufi saint Mir Sayyid Ali Hamadani arrived at Kashmir in his reign. In 1380 C.E. Qutbud’din died and was succeeded by his son Sultan Sikander also known as the Sikander Butshikand.

Sikandar 

Sultan Sikandar (1389-1413 CE), was the sixth ruler of the Shah Mir Dynasty. 

Barring a successful invasion of Ladakh, Sikandar did not annex any new territory. Iinternal rebellions were ably suppressed. A welfare-state was installed — oppressive taxes were abolished, and free schools and hospitals were commissioned. Waqfs were endowed to shrines, mosques were commissioned, numerous Sufi preachers were provided with jagirs and installed in positions of authority, and feasts were regularly held. Economic condition was decent.

Jonaraja and later Muslim chroniclers accuse Sikandar of terminating Kashmir's longstanding syncretic culture by persecuting Pandits and destroying numerous Hindu shrines; Suhabhat — a Brahman neo-convert and Sikandar's Chief Counsel — is particularly blamed for having instigated him. Scholars caution against accepting the allegations at face value and attributing them solely to religious bigotry. His policies, like with the previous Hindu rulers, were likely meant to gain access to the immense wealth controlled by Brahminical institutions; further, Jonaraja's polemics stemmed, atleast in part, from his aversion to the slow disintegration of caste society under Islamic influence. However, Sikandar was also the first Kashmiri ruler to convert destroyed temples into Islamic shrines, and such a display of supremacy probably had its origins in religious motivations.

Sikandar died in April, 1413 upon which, the eldest son 'Mir' was anointed as the Sultan having adopted the title of Ali Shah.

Ali Shah
He was the seventh ruler of the Shah Mir Dynasty, and reigned between 1413 and 1420. He was defeated by Sultan Zain-ul-Abidin at Thanna with the help of Jasrath Khokhar, a chieftain from Pothohar Plateau. The fate of Ali Shah is uncertain: he may have died in captivity or have been put to death by Khokhar.

Zain-ul-Abidin

Zain-ul-Abidin was the eighth sultan of Kashmir. He was known by his subjects as Bod Shah or Budshah and ruled from 1418 to 1470.

Zain-ul-Abidin worked hard to establish a fair rule in Kashmir. He called back the Hindus who had left Kashmir during his father reign and allowed building of temples. Jizya was abolished too in his command. From the regulation of commodities to the reviving of old crafts, Abidin did everything for overall development of Kashmir and his subjects. Zain-ul-Abidin is also called as Akbar of Kashmir and Shahjahan of Kashmir on account of religion and development respectively.

Haider Shah
Next Sultan of Kashmir was Haji Khan, who succeeded his father Zain-ul-Abidin and took the title of Haidar Khan.

Interruption by Haidar Dughlat

In 1540, the Sultanate was briefly interrupted when Mirza Muhammad Haidar Dughlat, a Chagatai Turco-Mongol military general attacked and occupied Kashmir. Arriving in Kashmir, Haidar installed as sultan the head of the Sayyid faction, Nazuk. In 1546, after Humayun recovered Kabul, Haidar removed Nazuk Shah and struck coins in the name of the Mughal emperor. He died in 1550 after being killed in battle with the Kashmiris.  He lies buried in the Gorstan e Shahi in Srinagar.

Architecture 

Some of the architectural projects commissioned by the dynasty in Kashmir include:

 Jamia Masjid in Srinagar, Jammu and Kashmir
 Khanqah-e-Moulah in Srinagar, Jammu and Kashmir
 Aali Masjid in Srinagar, Jammu and Kashmir
 Tomb of the Mother of Zain-ul-Abidin in Srinagar, Jammu and Kashmir
Amburiq Mosque in Shigar, Gilgit-Baltistan
Chaqchan Mosque in Khaplu, Gilgit-Baltistan

Reign and successions

Note: Muhammad Shah had five separate reigns from 1484 to 1537.

See also

 Sikandar Butshikan
 Zain-ul-Abidin
 Mir Sayyid Ali Hamadani
 List of Sunni Muslim dynasties
 List of Monarchs of Kashmir

Notes

References

External links
 Baharistan-i-Shahi: A Chronicle of Mediaeval Kashmir

History of Kashmir
1339 establishments in Asia
14th-century establishments in India
Medieval India
History of India
History of Pakistan
1561 disestablishments in India
Sunni dynasties